Fabrizio Dentice (also Fabricio, Fabritio) (1539 in Naples – 24 February 1581 in Naples) was an Italian composer and virtuoso lute and viol player.

Fabrizio was the son of Luigi Dentice (1510–1566) who served the powerful Sanseverino family and had a great reputation as a singer and lutenist. Fabrizio was also uncle to the harpsichordist Scipione Dentice (1560–1633).

Musical Editions
Dinko Fabris. Da Napoli a Parma: itinerari d'un musicista aristocratico. Opera vocali di Fabrizio Dentice, 15630ca-1580. Rome and Milan: Accademia Nazionale di Santa Cecilia, 1998.
Dinko Fabris and John Griffiths (eds). Neapolitan Lute Music: Fabrizio Dentice, Giulio Severino, Giovanni Antonio Severino, Francesco Cardone. Recent Researches in Music of the Renaissance 140. Madison: A-R Editions, 2004. (Includes all Dentice's known lute music including doubtful ascriptions)

Selected discography
Vocal works:
De Lamentatione Hieremiae on Italia Mia, Musical Imagination of the Renaissance. Huelgas Ensemble, Paul Van Nevel, Philippe Verdelot, et al. Sony 1992.
Miserere. on Emilio de Cavalieri Lamentations. Le Poème Harmonique dir. Vincent Dumestre, Alpha 2002
Versetti del Miserere, in falsibordoni del Dentice passeggiati da Donatello Coya eunuco della Real Capella (1622) [6'54"] on Magnificat anima mea. Il Culto Mariano e l'Oratorio Filippino nella Napoli del'600. Cappella della Pietà de' Turchini Symphonia 1996

Instrumental:
2 lute pieces, (with songs by father Luigi Dentice - Come t'haggio lassata, o via mia? Chi me l'havesse dett', o via mia?) on Napolitane - villanelle, arie & moresche (1530-70). Ensemble Micrologus, Cappella della Pietà de' Turchini dir. Florio, Opus111 1999
The Siena Lute Book Jacob Heringman Avie-AV0036 2004

References

1530s births
1580s deaths
Italian classical composers
Italian male classical composers
Italian lutenists
Viol players
Renaissance composers